"I'm Here" is a single by Canadian country music artist Charlie Major. Released in 1994, it was the sixth single from Major's debut album The Other Side. The song reached #1 on the RPM Country Tracks chart in February 1995.

Chart performance

Year-end charts

References

1994 singles
Charlie Major songs
Songs written by Charlie Major
Songs written by Barry Brown (Canadian musician)
1993 songs
Arista Records singles